The following is a list of squads for each nation competing in football 7-a-side at the 2016 Summer Paralympics in Rio de Janeiro.

Group A

Brazil
The following is the Brazil squad in the football 7-a-side tournament of the 2016 Summer Paralympics.

Great Britain
The following is the Great Britain squad in the football 7-a-side tournament of the 2016 Summer Paralympics.

Ireland
The following is the Ireland squad in the football 7-a-side tournament of the 2016 Summer Paralympics.

Ukraine
The following is the Ukraine squad in the football 7-a-side tournament of the 2016 Summer Paralympics.

Group B

Argentina
The following is the Argentina squad in the football 7-a-side tournament of the 2016 Summer Paralympics.

Iran
The following is the Iran squad in the football 7-a-side tournament of the 2016 Summer Paralympics.

Netherlands
The following is the Netherlands squad in the football 7-a-side tournament of the 2016 Summer Paralympics.

United States
The following is the United States squad in the football 7-a-side tournament of the 2016 Summer Paralympics.

See also
 Football 5-a-side at the 2016 Summer Paralympics – Team squads

References

Squads
Paralympic association football squads